Kannonkoski Church is a Lutheran church in Kannonkoski, Finland. The church was designed by Pauli E. Blomstedt and represents Functionalism architecturally. The church was built in 1937–1938. Blomstedt never saw his church finished: he died in 1935 and the church was finished according to instructions by his wife, architect Märta Blomstedt, and architect Matti Lampén.

The church is listed as a nationally significant built heritage site by the Finnish National Board of Antiquities. Docomomo has also selected it as a significant example of modern architecture in Finland.

References

Churches completed in 1938
Lutheran churches in Finland
Modernist architecture in Finland